Colonsay  is a town in the Rural Municipality of Colonsay No. 342, in the Canadian province of Saskatchewan. Colonsay is located on Highway 16 (the Yellowhead Highway part of the Trans-Canada Highway) running east–west in central Saskatchewan near the intersection with Highway 2.

Colonsay derived its name from the Inner Hebrides Scottish island of Colonsay All the streets in the village are also named after islands located along the west coast of Scotland.

History
Colonsay experienced a record setting 167-day-long frost-free period in 1978, which was, to the dismay of a number of residents, still not a long enough growing season for yams or sweet potatoes.

The ship U-Sea Colonsay is named after the local potash mine.

Demographics 

Climate

Economy
The main economy of the area is agriculture featuring grain crops such as wheat, canola, barley, oats, rye, as well as lentils and peas. Livestock raised in the vicinity are cattle, hogs, sheep, and buffalo.  The potash mine of Colonsay was first named Noranda Mines Potash Division then separately constituted as Central Canada Potash. Central Canada Potash was acquired by Imc. Potash Corporation of Saskatchewan, Colonsay, IMC Potash Colonsay and is now  Mosaic Potash Colonsay.  Potash is mined and sold to crop nutrient manufacturers for fertilizer, as well as for use as an icemelter ingredient and water softener regenerant.

Sports
Colonsay & District Sports Centre was re-opened in 2006 following fund raising efforts by the community as well as funding initiatives such as the Green Municipal Investment Fund, a joint venture of the Government of Canada and the Federation of Canadian Municipalities. The Sports Centre has a new heating system as well as ice-cube heat which will allow a longer artificial ice season for skaters, curlers and ice hockey players.

The Colonsay Monarchs were a team that played for the Northern Saskatchewan Baseball League as of 1951.

See also
List of communities in Saskatchewan
List of rural municipalities in Saskatchewan

References

Further reading
 Book Title Colonsay memoirs, 1905–1955. Author Colonsay, Saskatchewan. High School
 Book Title Milestones and memories : Colonsay and Meacham Districts, 1905–1980. Published Colonsay, Sask. : R.M. 342 Celebrate Saskatchewan 1980 Committees, 1980

External links

Colonsay No. 342, Saskatchewan
Towns in Saskatchewan
Mining communities in Saskatchewan
Division No. 11, Saskatchewan